Datuk Shahruddin bin Md Salleh (Jawi: شهرالدين بن مد صالح) is a Malaysian politician who served as the Deputy Minister of Works in the Perikatan Nasional (PN) administration under Prime Minister Muhyiddin Yassin and Minister Fadillah Yusof from March 2020 to his resignation in June 2020, Deputy Minister of Federal Territories in the Pakatan Harapan (PH) administration under former Prime Minister Mahathir Mohamad and former Minister Khalid Abdul Samad from July 2018 to the collapse of the PH administration in February 2020, Chairman of the Malaysian Institute of Translation and Books (IBTM) from February 2010 to his removal from the position in October 2016, Member of Parliament (MP) for Sri Gading from May 2018 to November 2022 and the Member of the Johor State Legislative Assembly (MLA) for Jorak from March 2008 to May 2018. He was also political secretary to Muhyiddin. He is a member and was a State Chairman of Johor of the Homeland Fighters Party (PEJUANG) before October 2022 and was a member and 1st Secretary-General of the Malaysian United Indigenous Party (BERSATU), a component party of the ruling PN coalition and former component party of the PH opposition coalition and member of the United Malay National Organisation (UMNO), a component party of the Barisan Nasional (BN) coalition.

On 2 June 2020, only three months after PN swept into power in March, he expressed his readiness to resign as the Deputy Minister of Works to "save" his party, BERSATU which was split into two factions led by former party chairman and former Prime Minister Mahathir Mohamad as well as party President and Prime Minister Muhyiddin respectively who were embroiled in a political tussle. Two days later on 4 June 2020, he officially resigned from his position as the Deputy Minister of Works. However, a picture of a letter sent to Muhyiddin stating that he would remain a supporter of the government as a backbench MP was leaked online. Despite this, he later met with Mahathir who is allied with the opposition coalition PH. It was unclear whether Shahruddin supports the PN or PH coalition, with Shahruddin stating that he would address the matter via social media in the future. On 19 July 2020, his BERSATU membership was terminated after he had issued a notice to change the position of his seat in the Dewan Rakyat from the government bloc to the opposition bloc.

Election results

Honours

Honours of Malaysia
  :
  Officer of the Order of the Defender of the Realm (KMN) (2014)
  :
  Commander of the Order of the Territorial Crown (PMW) – Datuk (2010)

References 

 

Living people
Malaysian people of Malay descent
Malaysian Muslims
People from Johor
Former Malaysian United Indigenous Party politicians
Officers of the Order of the Defender of the Realm
Former United Malays National Organisation politicians
Members of the Dewan Rakyat
Members of the Johor State Legislative Assembly
21st-century Malaysian politicians
1956 births